Ruthenia may refer to:

 Ruthenia, a name applied to various East Slavic lands 
 Red Ruthenia, an East Slavic historical region
 Black Ruthenia, an East Slavic historical region
 White Ruthenia, an East Slavic historical region
 Carpathian Ruthenia, an East Slavic region (Rusynia) on the both sides of Carpathian Mountains
 Inner Carpathian Ruthenia, sub-region of Carpathian Ruthenia on the inner side of Carpathian Mountains
 Outer Carpathian Ruthenia, sub-region of Carpathian Ruthenia on the outer side of Carpathian Mountains
 Subcarpathian Ruthenia, relative term, most commonly used for the Inner Carpathian Ruthenia
 Ciscarpathian Ruthenia, relative term, most commonly used for the Outer Carpathian Ruthenia
 Transcarpathian Ruthenia, relative term, used in different geographical contexts, depending on a point of observation
 Kingdom of Ruthenia, an East Slavic kingdom in the 13th century
 Voivodeship of Ruthenia, a province of the early modern Kingdom of Poland 
 Grand Principality of Ruthenia (1658), a proposed state (1658)

See also
 Ruthenian (disambiguation)
 Russia (disambiguation)
 Rus (disambiguation)